Linyi is a prefecture-level city in the south of Shandong province, China. As of 2011, Linyi is the largest prefecture-level city in Shandong, both by area and population, Linyi borders Rizhao to the east, Weifang to the northeast, Zibo to the north, Tai'an to the northwest, Jining to the west, Zaozhuang to the southwest, and the province of Jiangsu to the south. The name of the city Linyi literally means "close to the Yi River".

The city recently expanded along the Yi River to Nanfang, now called the Beicheng New Area, under the slogan "Grand Linyi, Beautiful Linyi, New Linyi". Multiple recreational parks were built, along with new school campuses etc. The development is a consequence of a series of governmental projects, including relocate the city government, which is expected to stimulate the economy.

The population was 11,018,365 at the 2020 census, of which 3,651,868 lived in the built-up area made up of Lanshan District, Luozhuang District and Hedong District, as well as Linyi National Hi-Tech Zone.

Administration
The prefecture-level city of Linyi administers 12 county-level divisions, including three districts and nine counties.

The city is further divided into 181 township-level divisions.

History
Linyi has a history of 2400 years. It is home to many historical figures, notably Zhuge Liang and Wang Xizhi. In 1972, the Sun Tzu's Art of War was first discovered here, along with other classics on hand written bamboo slips. Sun Tzu's Art of War is currently in display at Shandong Provincial museum.

On July 25, 1668, an earthquake that had an estimated magnitude of  8.5, occurred just northeast of Linyi, making it the largest historical earthquake in Eastern China, and one of the largest in the world on land. In Linyi, no house was left standing, and black water was said to emerge from ground fissures that opened up after the earthquake.

In the spring of 1938, during the Second Sino-Japanese War, the city was the scene of fierce fighting between Chinese and Japanese troops. The civilians were encouraged by army victory in the Battle of Tai'erzhuang, which was nearby, defended Linyi fiercely, but Japanese soldiers breached the walls on April 19, 1938. The defenders withdrew the next day to another contested area 30 miles away.

In 1946, during the Chinese Civil War, the communist Directorate General of Shandong Wartime Posts was moved from the Yimeng Mountains to Linyi and renamed the Shandong Provincial Postal Administration.

After the People's Republic of China was founded in October 1949, the administrative division was adjusted.

In 2005, Linyi drew international attention as a center of human rights abuses related to the enforcement of China's controversial family planning policies. Following widespread allegations of violence and coercion in excess of Chinese law, local human rights defender Chen Guangcheng filed a class action lawsuit on behalf of the victims. The local Chinese courts refused to hear the case and imprisoned Chen Guangcheng on charges of fomenting state resistance. Due in part to the severity and scope of these abuses Linyi has been used by activists to criticize China's violation of women's rights.

Geography
Linyi is in the south of Shandong province, not far from the ports of Rizhao, Lanshan District, Rizhao and Lianyungang. It is along the G2 Beijing–Shanghai Expressway as well as the Eurasian Land Bridge.

Climate 
Linyi has a monsoon-influenced climate with generous summer precipitation, cold, dry winters, and hot, humid summers. Under the Köppen climate classification, it is in the transition from the humid subtropical zone (Cwa) to the humid continental zone (Dwa), though favouring the former. More than half of the annual precipitation of  falls in July and August alone, and the frost-free period is above 200 days.

Economy
Linyi's economy is based around its wholesale markets. The Linyi Wholesale City is ranked 3rd in its category in China with an annual trade volume of 40 billion RMB (~US$5 billion). The Linyi prefecture has developed more than 1,500 specialized villages, over 80 specialized towns and nearly 800 industrialized agricultural enterprises.

In 2014 the prefecture's GDP was 369 billion RMB. Main industrial products are: textiles, foodstuffs, machinery, electronics, chemicals, building materials, coal, medicines, gold and porcelain. Machinery is exported to Europe, the Americas and south-east Asia. Linyi prefecture has an annual capacity of three million tons of compound fertilizers.

The city is served by Linyi Qiyang Airport.

Notable people
Xunzi (312–230 BCE), philosopher
Wang Xiang (185–269), Eastern Han Dynasty politician, famous for his fillial piety
Wang Xizhi (303–361), Eastern Jin Dynasty calligrapher
Zhuge Liang (181–234), statesman and strategist
He Chengtian (370–447), astronomer, calendarist and mathematician
Gui Guzi, military strategist, teacher of renowned Warring States generals Sun Bin and Pang Juan
Zuo Baogui (1837–1894), general of the Qing Dynasty
Xue Qikun (1963), physicist specializing in condensed matter physics

Cultural Attractions
Linyi's focal point is the People's Square (Renmin Guangchang). It was built in the early 1990s on the site of an old army barracks. Underneath it is a shopping centre and entertainment facilities.

Just north of the city centre is a park dedicated to Wang Xizhi. For a small entrance fee tourists can enjoy a pleasant walk and try Chinese calligraphy.

Near the center of Linyi city is a museum which houses some original bamboo strips from the Warring States period.

See also
List of twin towns and sister cities in China

References

External links

Government website of Linyi 

 
Cities in Shandong
Prefecture-level divisions of Shandong
National Forest Cities in China